Nectarinia is a genus of birds in the sunbird family, Nectariniidae. What species belong to it has been highly contentious for many decades. Towards the late 20th century, the dominant trend was to use it to group all "typical" sunbirds. More recently taxonomists have divided the Nectarinia into eight genera which are now considered distinct from Nectarinia: Leptocoma, Anabathmis, Chalcomitra, Cinnyris, Cyanomitra, Dreptes, Anthobaphes, and Drepanorhynchus.

Species
The genus now contains six species:

References

 
Bird genera
Taxonomy articles created by Polbot